The Helsinki City Theatre is a theatre located in Helsinki, Finland. Owned by the Helsinki Theatre Foundation, it calls itself a "modern popular bilingual repertoire theatre."

The Helsinki City Theatre is the only Finnish representative in the European Theatre Convention. In addition to drama and musicals, the theatre operates a concert dance oriented branch, the Helsinki Dance Company.

Annual figures reported by the theatre include 20 new productions, 1,100 performances, and 350,000 spectators. The theatre has 250 permanent members of staff, and operates across 6 stages.

History
The theatre has its roots in two organizations: Helsingin Työväenteatteri ("Workers' Theatre of Helsinki", established in 1902) and Helsingin Kansanteatteri (People's Theatre of Helsinki, established in 1934). These two merged in 1948 to form Helsingin Kansanteatteri-Työväenteatteri ("People's and Workers' Theatre of Helsinki"), which eventually transitioned into the Helsinki City Theatre in 1964. The rebranding was largely a result of the emergence of the Helsinki Theatre Foundation, who owns the theatre, and whose members are elected by the City Council of Helsinki.

Prior to 1965, the Helsinki City Theatre operated on third-party stages, after which the organization chose to construct a theatre building of their own. They held an architectural competition for the design of the new building, which was won by Timo Penttilä. The building designed by Penttilä opened in 1967. In 1989, an annex building was constructed, which was also designed by Penttilä's architectural firm.

Stages
Big stage — 947 seats
Arena stage — 500 seats
Small stage— 347 seats
Studio Pasila — 324 seats
Lilla Teatern — 267 seats
Studio Elsa — 240 seats

See also
 Alexander Theatre
 Club act!one (2003)
 Finnish National Theatre
 Swedish Theatre

References

External links

Theatres in Helsinki
Theatres completed in 1967